Håvard Bjerkeli (born August 5, 1977) is a Norwegian cross-country skier who competed between 1996 and 2006. He won a silver medal in the individual sprint at the 2003 FIS Nordic World Ski Championships in Val di Fiemme.

Bjerkeli also finished 13th in the individual sprint at the 2002 Winter Olympics in Salt Lake City. He also has fifteen individual victories from 1999 to 2004.

Cross-country skiing results
All results are sourced from the International Ski Federation (FIS).

Olympic Games

World Championships
 1 medal – (1 silver)

World Cup

Season standings

Individual podiums
 3 victories
 5 podiums

Team podiums

 3 victories – (1 , 2 ) 
 4 podiums – (1 , 3 )

References

External links

Norwegian male cross-country skiers
Olympic cross-country skiers of Norway
Cross-country skiers at the 2002 Winter Olympics
1977 births
Living people
FIS Nordic World Ski Championships medalists in cross-country skiing
People from Molde
Sportspeople from Møre og Romsdal